BBC Radio Tees is the BBC's local radio station serving the former county of Cleveland which comprises the unitary authorities of Hartlepool, Middlesbrough, Redcar and Cleveland and Stockton-on-Tees.

It broadcasts on FM, DAB, digital TV and via BBC Sounds from studios on Newport Road in Middlesbrough.

According to RAJAR, the station has a weekly audience of 109,000 listeners and a 3.2% share as of December 2022.

History

BBC Radio Teesside
The station was originally launched as Radio Teesside at 18:00 on 31 December 1970 with a local news programme entitled Teesside Tonight, presented by George Lambelle, who later won five major programming awards.

BBC Radio Cleveland

On 1 April 1974 the station became known as Radio Cleveland when the county of Cleveland was formed. The station moved to new studios in 1983. On 1 April 1996, the county of Cleveland was abolished and the boroughs of Stockton-on-Tees, Hartlepool, Middlesbrough, and Redcar and Cleveland were returned to County Durham and North Yorkshire. These four boroughs, along with nearby Darlington, now form the governmental sub-region of Tees Valley. Also included in the main coverage area is the Army's main garrison at Catterick Garrison, which is also included in the transmission area of Radio York on 104.3 FM.

BBC Tees

On Saturday 11 August 2007 the station was renamed BBC Tees. The BBC Tees brand was already associated with its "Where I Live" website and "BBC Bus", which have both since been discontinued.

BBC Radio Tees
On 27 January 2020 the station was renamed BBC Radio Tees, the addition of "radio" to the names of most BBC local radio stations was to avoid confusion with its similarly named TV news regions.

Transmitters
Before moving to Eston Nab, the signal on 95 FM originally was relatively strong and originated from the 900-foot Bilsdale transmitter on the North York Moors. A relay transmitter covering the town of Whitby broadcasts on 95.8 FM. The DAB signals come from the Bauer 11B multiplex at Eston Nab (near the A174 road) and Brusselton (near Shildon between the A68 and A6072).

On 10 August 2021, FM transmission was knocked off air indefinitely following a fire at the Bilsdale site. It is feared that the structural integrity of the transmitter mast may have been compromised.  As at 11 August 2021, the 95 FM service is available again, using the Eston Nab transmitter, but it does not reach all areas of the station's transmission area. A temporary transmitter on 104.0 FM has also been instated for Darlington and the surrounding areas.

The station also broadcast on medium wave until 1992.

BBC Radio Tees is also available on DAB in Teesside, County Durham and North Yorkshire and online via BBC Sounds. In addition, the station also broadcasts on Freeview TV channel 722.

Programming
Local programming is produced and broadcast from the BBC's Middlesbrough studios from 6am - 10pm each day.

The late show, airing from 10pm - 1am, originates from BBC Radio Newcastle every night.

During the station's downtime, BBC Radio Tees simulcasts overnight programming from BBC Radio 5 Live and BBC Radio London.

Notable past presenters
Ali Brownlee
Richard Hammond

References

External links 
BBC Radio Tees
 History of local radio in Cleveland and Durham
MDS975's Transmitter Map
Bilsdale West Moor transmitter
Whitby transmitter

Radio stations established in 1970
Tees
County Durham
North Yorkshire
Mass media in Yorkshire
Teesside
Radio stations in North East England
1970 establishments in England